Sir Michael Anthony Green (born 23 October 1964) is a British High Court judge.

Personal life and education 
Green was born in London, England and educated at University College School. He then attended Jesus College, Cambridge, where he graduated with a BA in law in 1986.

In 1991, he married Giselle Finlay and together they have a son and two daughters.

Career 
He was called to the bar at Lincoln's Inn in 1987 and practised commercial and company law from Fountain Court chambers. He took silk in 2009, was appointed a deputy High Court judge in 2018. In 2019, he was a judge on the Commercial Court of the British Virgin Islands. In 2008, he was a member of the monitoring board at HM Prison Wormwood Scrubs. 

On 2 November 2020, Green was appointed a judge of the High Court and assigned to the Chancery Division. He received the customary knighthood in the same year.

References 

Living people
1964 births
21st-century English judges
Knights Bachelor
Members of Lincoln's Inn
Alumni of Jesus College, Cambridge
Chancery Division judges
Lawyers from London
People educated at University College School
British Virgin Islands judges